The Kentucky Oaks is a Grade I stakes race for three-year-old Thoroughbred fillies staged annually in Louisville, Kentucky, United States. The Kentucky Oaks is held on the Friday before the Kentucky Derby each year. The winner gets $750,000 of the $1,250,000 purse, and a large garland blanket of lilies, resulting in the nickname "Lillies for the Fillies." A silver Kentucky Oaks Trophy is presented to the winner.

History
The first running of the Kentucky Oaks was on May 19, 1875, when Churchill Downs was known as the Louisville Jockey Club. The race was founded by Meriwether Lewis Clark Jr. along with the Kentucky Derby, the Clark Handicap, and the Falls City Handicap.

The Kentucky Oaks and the Kentucky Derby are the oldest continuously contested sporting events in American history. The Kentucky Oaks was modeled after the British Epsom Oaks, which has been run annually at Epsom Downs, Epsom, in Surrey since 1779. In the first race, the horse Vinaigrette won the then  mile race in a time of 2:, winning a purse of $1,175. Since that race, the Kentucky Oaks has been held each year.

In 2020, due to the COVID-19 pandemic, the Kentucky Oaks was rescheduled from May 1 to September 4.

The Kentucky Oaks is considered by some to be among the most popular horse races in American horse-racing society due to its high attendance. It has attracted about 100,000 people in attendance each year since 2001's 127th running of the Kentucky Oaks. In 1980, attendance reached about 50,000 people and by 1989, it had increased to about 67,000. The attendance at the Kentucky Oaks ranks third in North America and usually surpasses the attendance of all other stakes races including the Belmont Stakes and the Breeders' Cup. The attendance of the Kentucky Oaks typically only trails the Kentucky Derby and the Preakness Stakes; for more information see American thoroughbred racing top attended events.

The Kentucky Oaks, the Black-Eyed Susan Stakes, and the Acorn Stakes are the counterparts to the Triple Crown of Thoroughbred Racing, held at Churchill Downs, Pimlico Race Course and Belmont Park, respectively. The "Filly Triple Crown", known as the Triple Tiara of Thoroughbred Racing, is a series of three races at the Belmont Park and Saratoga Race Course. The National Thoroughbred Racing Association (NTRA) has considered changing the Triple Tiara series to the three counterparts of the Triple Crown.

In local culture

Despite the increasing number of out-of-state visitors who attend the race every year, the "Oaks" (as local residents simply refer to it) is considered to be a local event by the people of Kentuckiana (the Ohio Valley, centered around Louisville, and consisting of much of northern Kentucky and southern Indiana). Large crowds of Louisvillians and others from the Kentuckiana attend the Oaks annually and the infield of the race track hosts numerous musical attractions, boardwalk games, and food and alcoholic beverage vendors. Bringing in one's own alcohol is forbidden at Churchill Downs and many locals revel in finding ingenious ways to smuggle in their own libations, rather than pay the inflated prices inside Churchill Downs. Most every school and quite a few businesses in the Kentuckiana region treat the Oaks as a holiday. Perhaps out of self-consciousness for the gambling aspect of the race, none of the region's schools declare that the holiday is explicitly because of the Oaks and most simply say it is an "administrative holiday."

Charitable Initiative
On Kentucky Oaks Day, Churchill Downs Racetrack is a vision in pink as more than 100,000 guests are asked to incorporate pink into their attire in an effort to drive national attention to the fight against breast and ovarian cancer.

Changes in distance
The Kentucky Oaks has been run at four different distances:

1875–1890, the race was  miles;
1891–1895, it was  miles;
1896–1919, it was  miles;
1920–1941, changed to  miles;
1942–1981, run at  miles; and
1982, set at  miles, and it has been that distance since.

Records

Speed record
 mile 1:48.28 - Shedaresthedevil (2020)
 mile 2:39 - Felicia (1877), Belle of Nelson (1878) and Katie Creel (1882).
 mile 2:15 - Selika (1894)
 mile 1:43.6 - Ari's Mona (1950) and Sweet Alliance (1977).

Largest winning margin
 lengths  – Rachel Alexandra (2009)

Longest shot to win the Oaks
47/1 – Lemons Forever (2006)

Most wins by a jockey
4 – Eddie Arcaro (1951, 1952, 1953, 1958)
4 – Manuel Ycaza (1959, 1960, 1963, 1968)

Female jockeys to win
Rosie Napravnik (2012, 2014)

Most wins by a trainer

5 – Woody Stephens (1959, 1960, 1963, 1978, 1981)
5 – D. Wayne Lukas (1982, 1984, 1989, 1990, 2022)

Most wins by an owner
6 – Calumet Farm (1943, 1949, 1952, 1953, 1956, 1979)

Only brothers to both win the Kentucky Oaks
Carl Seay Goose "Ganz" (1913) – Roscoe Tarleton Goose (1916) 
Carl used the original German spelling of "Goose", which one of a few spellings was "Ganz", but also Gantz, Gans, and so on.

The Goose brothers are cousins of Meriwether Lewis Clark Jr., the founder of the Louisville Jockey Club.

Winners

Notes

See also
Kentucky Oaks "top three finishers" and starters
Road to the Kentucky Oaks
American thoroughbred racing top attended events
List of graded stakes at Churchill Downs
List of attractions and events in the Louisville metropolitan area
Pink ribbon

References

External links
KentuckyOaks.com – Official website

 
Grade 1 stakes races in the United States
Flat horse races for three-year-old fillies
Recurring sporting events established in 1875
Churchill Downs horse races
Kentucky Derby
Sports competitions in Louisville, Kentucky
1875 establishments in Kentucky